is a Japanese voice actor and television announcer noted primarily in the English-speaking world for his appearance as the kitchen reporter in Iron Chef, where he was known for his rapid-fire announcing style.  On the English-language version of Iron Chef, which aired on Food Network, Ohta's dialogue is dubbed by American voice actor Jeff Manning. Ohta's character is perhaps best known for his line, "Fukui-san?" (Mr. Fukui), which he would say several times per episode, when interrupting Kenji Fukui's commentary with a report from the field. His talent agency is Aoni Production.

Filmography 
Getter Robo Go (1991) - Guardman
Sailor Moon (1992) - Ryo Urawa, Bumboo, Ned, Kamoi
Shippū! Iron Leaguer (1993) - Gold Mask
Aoki Densetsu Shoot (1993) - Tsuyoshi Akahori
Dragon Ball Z: The History of Trunks (1993) - Tenshu
Orguss 02 (1993) - Lean
Captain Tsubasa J (1994) - Jun Misugi (adult)
Marmalade Boy (1994) - Satoshi Miwa
Romeo's Blue Skies (1995) - Tachioni
Dragon Ball GT (1996) - Kibito Kaiōshin
Doctor Slump (1997) - Taro Soramame
Iron Chef (1998) - Kitchen Reporter
One Piece (1999) - Shura, Peepley Lulu, Momonga
Gadget and the Gadgetinis (2002) - General Sir
Inuyasha (2001) - Satsuki's Brother
Ultimate Muscle (2002) - Tyrannoclaw
Bobobo-bo Bo-bobo (2003) - Narrator, Serviceman
Full Metal Panic? Fumoffu (2003) - Jin High Rugby Team Member B
Yu-Gi-Oh! Duel Monsters GX (2004) - Mattimatica
Gunparade Orchestra (2005) - Sora Kojima
GoGo Sentai Boukenger (2006) - Narrator, equipment (voice)
Gegege no Kitaro (2007) - chairman, Mamemura
Kamen Rider Decade (2009) - Reporter
Food Battle Club - Field Reporter
KR Double Hyper Battle DVD: Donburi's α/Farewell Recipe of Love - Frog Pod
Pride Fighting Championships - Ring Announcer
Sotsugyo M - Ryunosuke Sugita

Drama CD 
Dengeki Bunko Best Game Selection7 Fire Emblem Tabidati no syou - Marth
GFantasy Comic CD Collection Fire Emblem: Ankoku Ryū to Hikari no Ken - Julian
Lunar: Eternal Blue Lunar Eternal Blue: Lunatic Parade: Vol. 1 Lunar: Eternal Blue Hope's Second Chance! - Leo/Mystere

Video games 
Lunar: Eternal Blue (1994) - Leo
BS Shiren the Wanderer: Save Surara (1996) - Shiren
BS Fire Emblem: Akaneia Senki (1997) - Navarre, Belf, additional voices
Mystical Ninja Starring Goemon (1998) - Goemon
Kinnikuman Generations (2004) - Screw Kid

Japanese dub 
Caravan of Courage: An Ewok Adventure - Narrator
Pinocchio - Foul Fellow

External links 
website at Aoni Productions(Japanese)
 

1971 births
Living people
Japanese male voice actors
Male voice actors from Kanagawa Prefecture
20th-century Japanese male actors
21st-century Japanese male actors
Aoni Production voice actors